Milhaud station (French: Gare de Milhaud) is a railway station in Milhaud, Gard, Occitanie, southern France. Within TER Occitanie, it is part of line 21 (Narbonne–Avignon).

References

Railway stations in Gard